Jung Man-sik (born December 11, 1974) is a South Korean actor. His name is also romanized as Jeong Man-sik or Joung Man-sik.

Filmography

Film

Television series
 Jungle Fish 2 (KBS2, 2010)
 Athena: Goddess of War (SBS, 2010)
 The Greatest Love (MBC, 2011)
 Drama Special "Lethal Move"  (KBS2, 2011)
 Me Too, Flower! (MBC, 2011)
 The King 2 Hearts (MBC, 2012)
 Drama Special "The Great Dipper"  (KBS2, 2012)
 The King of Dramas (SBS, 2012)
 I Can Hear Your Voice (SBS, 2013) (cameo, ep 18)
 Good Doctor (KBS2, 2013)
 Drama Festival "Principal Investigator - Save Wang Jo-hyun!"  (MBC, 2013)
 Glorious Day (SBS, 2014)
 Local Hero (OCN, 2016)
 Entertainer (SBS, 2016)
 Man to Man (JTBC, 2017)
 Falsify (SBS, 2017)
 Distorted (SBS, 2017)
 Bad Papa (MBC, 2018)
 Welcome to Waikiki 2 (JTBC, 2019) (cameo, ep 2)
 Vagabond (SBS, 2019)
 Chief of Staff (JTBC, 2019)
 Undercover (JTBC, 2021)
 Through the Darkness (SBS, 2022) - Park Dae-woong (special appearance) 
 Café Minamdang (KBS2, 2022) -  Jang Doo-jin
 Insider (JTBC, 2022) -  Yang-hwa

Web series 
 Concrete Market (TVING, 2022)

Variety show
 Law of the Jungle in Costa Rica (SBS, 2014-2015)

Music video
 NC.A - My Student Teacher (Lip Version)  (2013)
 Park Soo Jin - Fallin'  (2014)

Awards
 2004 Seoul Theater Festival: Award for Best Acting
 2014 22nd Korea Culture and Entertainment Awards: Excellence Award, Actor in a Film (Kundo: Age of the Rampant)

References

External links
 
 
 

1974 births
Living people
Brave Entertainment artists
South Korean male film actors
South Korean male television actors
South Korean male stage actors
21st-century South Korean male actors
People from Mokpo